"Louder" is a song by Filipino pop and R&B singer Jake Zyrus, as the third single from his second international studio album Infinity released on May 20, 2011, ahead of its planned May 30 release. It was credited under the name Charice, a name Zyrus used prior to his gender transition. This song was written by Daniel Jamas, Leah Haywood, Shelly Peiken and produced by Dreamlab.

Critical reception
'Louder' gained positive reviews from contemporary music critics. According to Amanda Hensel of PopCrush, Zyrus "actually comes to terms with the soiled love affair pretty quickly, and vows to keep marching on because it’s the right thing to do" saying that she "also addressed ‘Louder’ to be destined for greatness as the feel-good anthem of the summer".

Music video
After his 9/11 performances in Florida, Zyrus shot the music video for "Louder" on September 13, 2011. The music video was directed by Tim Cruz. Gil Duldulao, who choreographed the "One Day" music video, again lent his talent to the "Louder" music video. The music video premiered on EW.com on 18 October 2011.
On November 18, 2011, the music video received the Best Music Video Award in the 2011 International Film Festival Manhattan (IFFM).

Story
In the video, Zyrus is shown singing by a window before it is swapped with an empty room where he continues singing. The room then goes back again to the first scene before shifting towards another room where he is seen being accompanied by two unknown dancers. As he sings the chorus, the scene changes to different location while on the line "feel that rhythm" the video vibrates as if imitating shock waves.

Track listing
Digital download
"Louder" – 3:01
"Lost the Best Thing" – 3:36

Charts

Release history

References

External links
 143/Reprise
 www.charicemusic.com

2011 singles
Jake Zyrus songs
Songs written by Shelly Peiken
Songs written by Leah Haywood
Songs written by Daniel James (record producer)
2011 songs